Delibal is a 2015 Turkish film directed by Ali Bilgin. Çağatay Ulusoy and Leyla Lydia Tuğutlu starred in the film. The film was released on 25 December 2015.

Plot
Barış, who is an architecture student and makes music as a hobby, is a bipolar patient and enjoys enjoying life. When he first saw Füsun, he had a feeling he had never known in his life. Love, which is always tangential, has caught Barış this time. Who is this girl who made him taste love? He wants to reach this girl, whose name he does not even know, but whom he falls in love with, somehow, and he reaches… Finding Füsun, reaching is also complete; Füsun, who has nothing in her mind other than finishing university with a degree and doing a master's in America, also needs to be convinced of love. Barış, who is handsome, smart and sincere, finally achieves this. He makes Füsun fall in love with him and they get married. Everything is like in fairy tales. Until one day the fairy tale breaks down... Barış is a bipolar patient. The illness drives him crazy and he finally commits suicide.

Movie Soundtrack
Cagatay Ulusoy sang a song Mutlu Sonsuz for the film.The song has 52 million views as of October 2021.
'Mutlu Sonsuz', performed by Çağatay Ulusoy, became one of the most played songs on the radio, and broke a record by placing in the first place among the top 10 songs purchased on the digital platform.

Delibal's lyrics belong to Sezen Aksu and music by Sezen Aksu and Ozan Bayraşa's Happy Sonszu song became a hit with Çağatay Ulusoy's successful performance. The song Mutlu Sonsuz, whose clip received more than 10 million clicks even on official social media accounts alone, left behind names such as Soner Kabadayı, Demet Akalın, Birol Namoğlu, Göksel and Gülben Ergen, which are on the digital purchase list.

Cast
Cagatay Ulusoy-Barış
Leyla Lydia Tuğutlu - Füsun
Hüseyin Avni Danyal - Tarık
Nazan Kesal - Selma
Mustafa Avkıran - Hayri
Laçin Ceylan - Macide
Bahtiyar Engin
Zafer Akkoyun - Haydar
Defne Kayalar
Toprak Sağlam - Filiz
Baturalp Yılmaz - Gitarist
Mert Carım - Ahmet
Barış Aytaç - Onur
Ali Seyitoğlu - Tunç
Kıvılcım Ural - Nisan
Emre Karaoğlu - Taner

References

External Links
 
 

2015 films
2010s Turkish-language films
Films set in Istanbul
2015 comedy-drama films
Warner Bros. films
Turkish comedy-drama films